Yolande Amana Guigolo (born September 15, 1997) is a Cameroonian volleyball player. She was a member of the Cameroon women's national volleyball team  at the 2016 Summer Olympics.

References

1997 births
Living people
Cameroonian women's volleyball players
Olympic volleyball players of Cameroon
Volleyball players at the 2016 Summer Olympics
21st-century Cameroonian women